The Under Secretary of Defense for Acquisition and Sustainment, or USD(A&S), is the Principal Staff Assistant (PSA) and advisor to the Secretary of Defense for all matters relating to acquisition and sustainment in the Department of Defense. This includes the DoD Acquisition System; system design and development; production; logistics and distribution; installation maintenance, management, and resilience; military construction; procurement of goods and services; material readiness; maintenance; environment and energy resilience (including renewable energy); utilities; business management modernization; International Armaments Cooperation, Cooperative Acquisition and International Agreements, Promoting exportability of military components to allies and partners; nuclear, chemical and biological defense programs; and nuclear command, control, and communications.

Ellen Lord became the first Under Secretary of Defense for Acquisition and Sustainment on 1 February 2018, after serving as the final Under Secretary of Defense for Acquisition, Technology, and Logistics.

The Under Secretary is appointed from civilian life by the President with the consent of the Senate to serve at the pleasure of the President.

Overview
The mission of the OUSD(A&S) is Enable the Delivery and Sustainment of Secure and Resilient Capabilities to the Warfighter and International Partners Quickly and Cost Effectively.

The Office of the Under Secretary of Defense for Acquisition and Sustainment (OUSD(A&S)) is focused on forming an acquisition system that moves at the speed of relevance, and to do that, has been shaped into an organization that provides a defense-wide adaptive acquisition framework from need identification to disposal. Using data-driven analysis linked with the National Defense Strategy, OUSD(A&S) scales to enable new product and process development and supports a culture of innovation, critical thinking, and creative compliance. There are multiple organizations that fall under OUSD(A&S) that also work towards this goal.

The Office of the Assistant Secretary of Defense for Acquisition (ASD(A))  delivers capability at the point of need through a Defense Acquisition System that is flexible, tailorable, and enables speed. ASD(A) is focused on moving defense acquisition away from being expensive, slow, and burdensome by reducing timelines, lowering costs, and improving quality while rapidly introducing new technology to enhance capability.

Office of the Assistant Secretary of Defense for Sustainment (ASD(Sustainment))  works with logistics and materiel readiness in the Department of Defense (DoD) and is the principal logistics official within the senior management of the DoD. In this capacity, the ASD(S) prescribes policies and procedures for the conduct of logistics, maintenance, materiel readiness, strategic mobility, and sustainment support in the DoD, to include, supply, maintenance, and transportation.

The office of Nuclear, Chemical, and Biological (CNB)  defense programs leads DoD efforts in preparing for, deterring, and mitigating current and future weapons of mass destruction (WMD) threats. They aim to sustain and modernize the U.S. nuclear deterrent; develop capabilities to detect, protect against and respond to WMD threats; ensure DoD compliance with nuclear, chemical, and biological treaties and agreements; continue to work with allies and partners to strengthen our collective countering weapons of mass destruction (CWMD) capabilities; and advance the United States nonproliferation goals.

The Industrial Policy  office supports the Under Secretary of Defense for Acquisition and Sustainment by providing detailed analyses and in-depth understanding of the increasingly global, commercial, and financially complex industrial supply chain essential to our national defense.

The Executive Director for Special Access Program Central Office  facilitates and maintains MOAs and memorandums of understanding for foreign involvement with DoD SAPs and coordinates with appropriate oversight authorities.

International Cooperation (IC)  Office is to strengthen key international partnerships through cooperative Acquisition & Sustainment initiatives to improve interoperability and sharpen the warfighter’s technological edge. IC prioritizes enabling a lethal, secure, and networked constellation of allies and partners.

History
The Military Retirement Reform Act of 1986 created the position of Under Secretary of Defense for Acquisition (USD(A)), which was implemented with the issuance of Department of Defense Directive 5134.1 in February 1987. As part of this act, the position of Under Secretary of Defense for Research and Engineering (USD(R&E)) was redesignated as the Director of Defense Research and Engineering (DDR&E), a lower-ranking position which reported to the new USD(A).

The title of USD(A) was changed to Under Secretary of Defense for Acquisition and Technology (USD(A&T)) by the National Defense Authorization Act for Fiscal Year 1994, and the position was later redesignated as the Under Secretary of Defense for Acquisition, Technology, and Logistics (USD(AT&L)) by the National Defense Authorization Act for Fiscal Year 2000. The USD(AT&L) served as the principal assistant to the Secretary of Defense for research and development, production, procurement, logistics, and military construction.

The National Defense Authorization Act for Fiscal Year 2017 removed the position of USD(AT&L), and in its place it created the position of USD(R&E) once again, as well as the new position of USD(A&S). These changes took effect on 1 February 2018. As part of the reorganization, the Assistant Secretary of Defense for Logistics and Materiel Readiness (ASD(L&MR)) and Assistant Secretary of Defense for Energy, Installations, and Environment (ASD(EI&E)) positions were combined into a new Assistant Secretary of Defense for Sustainment.

Organization

 Deputy Under Secretary of Defense for Acquisition and Sustainment
 Office of the Assistant Secretary of Defense for Acquisition
 Defense Acquisition University
 Defense Contract Management Agency
 Joint Rapid Acquisition Cell
 Office of the Assistant Secretary of Defense for Sustainment 
 Office of Local Defense Community Corporation
 Defense Logistics Agency
Office of the Assistant Secretary of Defense for Energy, Installations, and Environment
Office of the Deputy Assistant Secretary of Defense for Real Property (RP)
Office of the Deputy Assistant Secretary of Defense for Construction (Con)
Office of the Deputy Assistant Secretary of Defense for Housing (H)
Office of the Deputy Assistant Secretary of Defense for Environment & Energy Resilience (E&ER)
 Office of the Secretary of Defense for Nuclear, Chemical, and Biological Defense Programs
 Defense Threat Reduction Agency
 Office of the Deputy Assistant Secretary of Defense for Industrial Policy 
 Chief Information Security Officer (Acquisition and Sustainment)
 Office of International Cooperation
 Office of Special Programs
 Office of Human Capital Initiatives 
 Director, Commander’s Action Group

Office of the Under Secretary

The Office of the Under Secretary of Defense for Acquisition and Sustainment (OUSD(A&S)), a unit of the Office of the Secretary of Defense, supervises all Department of Defense acquisitions, including procurement of goods and services, research and development, developmental testing, and contract administration, for all elements of the Department. Led by the Under Secretary, OUSD(A&S) oversees logistics, maintenance, and sustainment support for all elements of the Department and establishes policies for the maintenance of the defense industrial base of the United States.

The work of OUSD(A&S) is conducted through its several staff directorates, including:
Human Capital Initiatives Directorate – responsible for executing all workforce responsibilities identified by the Secretary of Defense
Acquisition Resources and Analyses Directorate – integrates the diverse aspects of Defense acquisition into a balanced and coherent program that supports the National Strategy and makes the most effective use of resources provided
International Cooperation Directorate – supports the Under Secretary in all aspects of international cooperation, develops policy for international cooperative armaments programs, and provides the Under Secretary a single, integrated picture of international cooperative activities
Special Programs Directorate – manages the DoD Special Access Program (SAP) management and control structures
Small Business Programs Directorate – advises the Secretary of Defense on all matters related to small business and is committed to maximizing the contributions of small business in DoD acquisitions
Administration Directorate – serves as the central focal point for all OUSD(AT&L) civilian and military personnel programs, organizational management, space, facilities, supply management, security, information management, travel, budgeting, and training
Defense Procurement & Acquisition Policy Directorate – responsible for all acquisition and procurement policy matters in the Department, including serving as the principal advisor to the Under Secretary on acquisition/procurement strategies for all major weapon systems programs, major automated information systems programs, and services acquisitions
Joint Rapid Acquisition Cell – provides a single point of contact in the Office of the Secretary of Defense for tracking the timeliness of immediate warfighter need actions for the senior leadership and facilitating coordination with other government agencies
Defense Science Board – provides senior Department leadership independent advice and recommendations on scientific, technical, manufacturing, acquisition process, and other matters of special interest to the Department
Office of the Deputy Assistant Secretary of Defense for Industrial Policy – responsible for ensuring that Department policies, procedures, and actions:
stimulate and support vigorous competition and innovation in the industrial base supporting defense
establish and sustain cost-effective industrial and technological capabilities that assure military readiness and superiority

Office holders

Under Secretary

Deputy Under Secretary

See also
 The Technical Cooperation Program (TTCP) – An international defense science and technology collaboration between Australia, Canada, New Zealand, the United Kingdom and the United States.

References

External links
Proposed and finalized federal regulations from the Under Secretary of Defense for Acquisition, Technology and Logistics

 
United States defense procurement